John Howard Falk (December 6, 1948) is Director of the Institute for Learning Innovation and Sea Grant Professor of Free-Choice Learning at Oregon State University. He's a leading expert on "free-choice learning," learning guided by a person's needs and interests. At the Smithsonian Institution's Chesapeake Bay Center for Environmental Studies at Edgewater, Maryland, Falk spent over 13 years "studying lawns and how man relates to them." His current research focuses on the community impacts of museums, libraries, zoos, and aquariums; understanding the reasons people utilize free-choice learning settings during their spare time; and helping cultural institutions rethink their educational positioning in the contemporary era.



Books 

 Falk, J.H. (2021). "The Value of Museums: Enhancing Societal Well-Being" Lanham, MD: Rowman & Littlefield
 Falk, J.H. & Dierking L.D. (2018). "Learning from Museums, 2nd Edition" Lanham, MD: Rowman & Littlefield
 Falk, J.H. (2017). Born to Choose: Evolution, Self and Well-Being (Routledge).
 Falk, J.H. & Dierking, L.D. (2014). The Museum Experience Revisited. Walnut Creek, CA: Left Coast Press.
 Falk, J.H. (2009). Identity and the Museum Visitor Experience. Walnut Creek, CA: Left Coast Press.
 Falk, J.H., Heimlich, J.E., & Foutz, S. (eds.) (2009). Free-Choice Learning and the Environment.  Lanham, MD: AltaMira Press.
 Falk, J.H., Bronnenkant, Vernon, C.L., & Heimlich, J.E., (2007). Visitor Evaluation Toolbox for Zoos and Aquariums. Silver Spring, MD: Association of Zoos & Aquariums.
 Yager, R. & Falk, J.H. (eds.) (2007). Exemplary Science Program: Informal Science Education. Washington, DC: National Science Teachers Association.
 Falk, J.H., Reinhard, E.M., Vernon, C.L., Bronnenkant, K., Deans, N.L., Heimlich, J.E., (2007). Why Zoos & Aquariums Matter: Assessing the Impact of a Visit. Silver Spring, MD: Association of Zoos & Aquariums.
 Falk, J.H., Dierking, L.D., & Foutz, S. (eds.) (2007) In Principle-In Practice: Museums as Learning Institutions. Lanham, MD: AltaMira Press.
 Stein, J., Dierking, L., Falk, J. & Ellenbogen, K. (eds.) (2006). Insights: A museum learning resource. Annapolis, MD: Institute for Learning Innovation. http://www.ilinet.org/ipip/In_Principle_In_Practice_Insights_-_A_Museum_Learning_Resource.pdf
 Falk, J.H. & Sheppard, B. (2006) Thriving in the Knowledge Age: New business models for museums and other cultural institutions. Lanham, MD: AltaMira Press.
 Caban, G., Scott, C., Falk, J.H. & Dierking, L.D. (2003) Museums and Creativity: A study into the role of museums in design education. Sydney, AU: Powerhouse Publishing.
 Falk, J.H. & Dierking, L.D. (2002) Lessons without Limit:  How free-choice learning is transforming education. Lanham, MD: AltaMira Press.
 Falk, J.H. (Ed) (2001) Free-Choice Science Education: How We Learn Science Outside of School. New York, NY: Teacher's College Press, Columbia University.
 Falk, J.H. & Dierking, L.D. (2000) Learning from Museums: Visitor Experiences and the Making of Meaning. Lanham, MD: AltaMira Press.
 Falk, J.H. & Rosenberg, K. (1999). Bite-Sized Science. Chicago, IL: Chicago Review Press.
 Dierking, L.D., Falk, J.H., Holland, Fisher, S., Schatz, D. & Wilke, L. (1997). Collaborations: Critical Criteria for Success. Washington, DC: Association of Science-Technology Centers.
 Falk, J.H., Pruitt, R. II, Swift, K. & Katz, T. (1996). Bubble Monster and other science fun. Chicago, IL: Chicago Review Press.
 Falk, J.H. & Dierking, L.D. (Ed.) (1995). Public Institutions for Personal Learning: Establishing a Research Agenda. Washington, DC: American Association of Museums
 Falk, J.H. (1993) Factors Influencing Leisure Decisions: The Use of Museums by African Americans. Washington, DC: American Association of Museums.
 Falk, J.H. & Dierking, L.D. (1992). The Museum Experience. Washington, DC: Whalesback Books.
 Falk, J.H. (Ed.) (1989). Still More Smithsonian Science Activities New York: G.M.G. Publishing.
 Falk, J.H. (Ed.) (1988). More Smithsonian Science Activities New York: G.M.G. Publishing.
 Falk, J.H. (Ed.) (1987). Smithsonian Science Activities New York: G.M.G. Publishing.
 Falk, J.H. (1980). Lawn Guide. Nashua, N.H: Delta Publishing.
 Falk, J.H., Lawson, C. & Malone, L. (1973). The Lawn. Berkeley, CA: The Regents of the University of California, Berkeley. (out of print).

Awards 
 Distinguished Career Award, NARST: An worldwide organization for improving science teaching and learning through research (2016)
 Oregon State University, University Outreach and Engagement Vice Provost Award for Excellence, Innovation-Partnerships Award (2016)
 Council of Scientific Society Presidents Award for Educational Research (2013)
 Invited by the National Science Foundation to present one of its annual Distinguished Lectures (2013)
 Named by News Digest International as one of the "Who's Who" of Academia (2013, 2014)
 John Cotton Dana Award for Leadership, American Association of Museums (2010)
 Selected to American Association of Museums’ Centennial Honor Roll—one of 100 most influential individuals in the museum community, 1906-2006 (2006) 
 Marquis Who's Who in America (2001, 2002, 2003, 2004, 2005, 2006, 2007, 2008, 2009, 2010, 2011, 2012, 2013, 2014, 2015)

References

External links 
Museums:

 Keynote lecture at the Jewish Museum Berlin: "The Wiring of the Medium May Be New But the Users' Wiring Is Old"
 John H. Falk interview (2013)
 "The Five Minute Falk: A very brief explanation of John Falk's Visitor Identity Related Motivations"
 21st Century Museum Issues Lecture Series: "The Museum Experience Revisited"   
 "Understanding Museum Visitors' Motivations and Learning" 
 "Why Do We Go to Museums?" 
 Interview with John Falk and Beverly Sheppard (2009)

Other:
 "Where We Learn Science May Be Different Than You Think" 
 "Man and the Lawn - A Long Love Story" (New York Times article)
 "Hardwired to Learn" 
 Time Team America 
 "Lifelong Learning: AIBS Eye on Education

General/Academic:
 John H. Falk's Books 
 John H. Falk page at Oregon State University 
 John H. Falk page at Center for Research on Lifelong STEM Learning 
 John H. Falk page at Institute for Learning Innovation.org 
 "John Falk and Lynn Dierking: building the field of informal/free-choice science education" 
 Google Scholar citations 

Living people
21st-century American writers
Oregon State University faculty
1948 births
Museum educators